Ligustrum vulgare (wild privet, also sometimes known as common privet or European privet) is a species of Ligustrum native to central and southern Europe, north Africa and southwestern Asia, from Ireland and southwestern Sweden south to Morocco, and east to Poland and northwestern Iran.

Description

It is a semi-evergreen or deciduous shrub, growing to 3 m (rarely up to 5 m) tall. The stems are stiff, erect, with grey-brown bark spotted with small brown lenticels. The leaves are borne in decussate opposite pairs, sub-shiny green, narrow oval to lanceolate, 2–6 cm long and 0.5–1.5 cm broad. The flowers are produced in mid-summer in panicles 3–6 cm long, each flower creamy-white, with a tubular base and a four-lobed corolla ('petals') 4–6 mm diameter.  The flowers produce a strong, pungent fragrance that many people find unpleasant. The fruit is a small glossy black berry 6–8 mm diameter, containing one to four seeds. The berries are poisonous to humans but readily eaten by thrushes, which disperse the seeds in their droppings.

Plants from the warmer parts of the range show a stronger tendency to be fully evergreen; these have sometimes been treated as a separate variety Ligustrum vulgare var. italicum (Mill.) Vahl, but others do not regard it as distinct.

Cultivation and uses
In the British Isles it is the only native privet, common in hedgerows and woodlands in southern England and Wales, especially in chalk areas; it is less common in northern England, Scotland, and Northern Ireland, where it only occurs as an escapee from cultivation.

The species was used for hedging in Elizabethan gardens in England, but was superseded by the more reliably evergreen introduction L. ovalifolium from Japan.

A number of cultivars have been selected, including:
'Aureum' – yellow leaves.
'Buxifolium' – small, oval leaves not over 2.5 cm long.
'Cheyenne' – cold-tolerant clone selected in North America.
'Chlorocarpum' - berries green.
'Insulense' – long, narrow leaves 5–11 cm long and 1-2.5 cm broad.
'Leucocarpum' – berries greenish-white.
'Lodense' – dense, dwarf shrub (the name is a portmanteau of 'low' and 'dense').
'Pyramidale' – fastigiate.
'Xanthocarpum' – berries yellow.

Invasiveness
The species is listed as invasive as an introduced plant in Australia, Canada, New Zealand, and the United States. It is also fully naturalised in Mexico's highlands and Argentina.

Etymology
Ligustrum means 'binder'. It was named by Pliny and Virgil.

Gallery

See also
Privet as an invasive plant

References

vulgare
Plants described in 1753
Taxa named by Carl Linnaeus
Flora of Argentina
Flora of Canada
Flora of the United States
Flora of Australia
Flora of New Zealand
Flora of Mexico
Flora of Europe
Flora of Morocco
Flora of the Azores
Flora of the Canary Islands
Flora of Armenia
Flora of Azerbaijan
Flora of Georgia (country)
Flora of Iran
Flora of Turkey
Plant dyes